Gaylussacia mosieri, the hirsute huckleberry or woolly huckleberry, is a plant species native to the coastal plains of the southeastern United States (Louisiana, Mississippi, Alabama, Georgia, Florida).

Gaylussacia mosieri is a shrub up to 150 cm (5 feet) tall, sometimes forming small colonies. Shoots are covered with reddish hairs. Flowers are in groups of 4–8, white, or pink. Fruits are black, sweet and juicy. The species grows in swamps and marshes.

References

mosieri
Flora of the Southeastern United States
Flora of the Southern United States
Berries
Taxa named by John Kunkel Small
Plants described in 1927